Garry Joseph Wheeler (18 July 1956 – 25 January 1982) was a former Australian rules footballer who played with Footscray in the Victorian Football League (VFL).	

Gary played with Wodonga Football Club and won their best and award in 1981.

Gary was the younger brother of Terry Wheeler.

Notes

External links 
		

1956 births
1982 deaths
Australian rules footballers from Victoria (Australia)
Western Bulldogs players